Laura Walker may refer to:

 Laura S. Walker  (1861-1955), American author and conservationist
 Laura Ruth Walker (born 1957), American education and media executive
 Laura Walker (curler) (born 1990), Canadian curler
 Laura Walker (footballer) (born 1994), Swiss footballer
 Laura Walker (swimmer) (born 1970), American swimmer

See also
 Lauren Walker (born 1989), English footballer
 Laurie Walker (disambiguation)